The Ulu Yam railway station was a Malaysian train station which is now abandoned. It is located and named after the town of Ulu Yam, Selangor. It was closed in 2007 as it was not part of the Rawang-Ipoh double tracking project and was replaced by the nearby Batang Kali Komuter station.

References 

Defunct railway stations in Malaysia
Hulu Selangor District
Railway stations in Selangor